Haemoproteus is a genus of alveolates that are parasitic in birds, reptiles and amphibians. Its name is derived from Greek:  Haima, "blood", and Proteus, a sea god who had the power of assuming different shapes. The name Haemoproteus was first used in the description of H. columbae in the blood of the pigeon Columba livia by Kruse in 1890. This was also the first description of this genus. Two other genera — Halteridium and Simondia — are now considered to be synonyms of Haemoproteus.

The protozoa are intracellular parasites that infect the erythrocytes. They are transmitted by blood sucking insects including mosquitoes, biting midges (Culicoides), louse flies (Hippoboscidae) and horse-flies ("tabanids", "tabanid flies").  Infection with this genus is sometimes known as pseudomalaria because of the parasites' similarities with Plasmodium species.

Within the genus there are at least 173 species, 5 varieties and 1 subspecies. Of these over 140 occur in birds, 16 in reptiles and 3 in amphibia: 14 orders and 50 families of birds are represented. These include gamebirds (Galliformes), waterfowl (Anseriformes), raptors (Accipitriformes, Falconiformes, Strigiformes), pigeons and doves (Columbiformes),  and perching birds or songbirds (Passeriformes).

Taxonomy and systematics

Evolution 
The earliest known fossil is of a Haemoproteus-like organism (Paleohaemoproteus burmacis) was found in the abdominal cavity of a female biting midge trapped 100 million years ago in amber found in Myanmar.

Taxonomic history
The first description of this genus was in 1890 by Kruse who described H. columbae in the blood of the pigeon
Columba livia. McCallum in 1897 showed that the process of exflagellation was part of sexual reproduction in these parasites and thought it probable that the same process occurred in Plasmodium.  The first record of a haemoproteid parasite in a reptile was by Simond in 1901 who gave it the name H. metchnikovi.  The Sergent brothers in 1906 showed that the ectoparasitic fly Pseudolynchia canariensis was the vector of H. columbae. Aragao in 1908 demonstrated the schizogonic stages of H. columbae in the endothelial cells of the lungs of nestling pigeons infected by the bite of infected Pseudolynchia. It was generally believed that transmission of the parasites was by regurgitation during a blood meal until Adie showed that the parasites develop in the salivary glands in a fashion analogous to that of Plasmodium in mosquitoes.

The genus Halterium was created by the French parasitologist Alphonse Labbe for a species he observed with gametocytes in erythrocytes, with pigment granules, and halter-shaped when fully formed. This genus was soon subsumed into the genus Haemoproteus.

The genus Haemocystidium was created to give a name to the haemoproteid of a gecko belonging to the genus Hemidactylus in Sri Lanka by Castellani and Willey in 1904. A second species in this genus was described in 1909 by Johnston and Cleland who found pigmented gametocytes in the blood of the Australian tortoise Chelodina longicollis. These species were transferred to Haemoproteus in 1926 by Wenyon.

The genus was resurrected by Garnham in 1966 when he created a new generic name — Simondia — for the haemoproteids of chelonians. He followed the opinions of Wenyon, Hewitt and DeGiusti and suggested that all these parasites belonged to the one species — Simondia metchnikovi. He retained the name Haemocystidium for the haemoproteids of lizards.

A different genus of vectors was identified in 1957 by Fallis and Wood when they identified H. nettionis in Culicoides downesi Wirth and Hubert in Ontario, Canada.

Levine and Campbell in 1971 moved all the species in Simondia and Haemocystidium into Haemoproteus, an opinion that was followed by subsequent authors.

The genus Haemocystidium was resurrected again by Telford in 1996 when he described three new species of protozoa in geckos from Pakistan.

This genus like those of many protozoa may be further modified once additional DNA sequences are available. For instance, many DNA sequences have been identified for Haemoproteus in birds around the world in recent years, leading to new knowledge about the previously unknown diversity of this parasite in different regions.

Subgenera
The species infecting avian hosts have been divided into two subgenera — Haemoproteus and Parahaemoproteus — a division proposed in 1965 by Bennett et al.. These may be distinguished as follows:

: Vectors are hippoboscid flies (Hippoboscidae). Exflagellation does not occur below 20 degrees Celsius. Mature oocysts have diameters greater than 20 micrometres. The average length of the sporozoites is less than 10 micrometres. One end of the sporozoite is more pointed than the other. Although the majority are parasites of the Columbiformes, some species from this subgenus have also been reported in the Charadriiformes, Pelecaniformes and Suliformes.

: Parasites of birds other than the Columbiformes. Vectors are biting midges (Ceratopogonidae). Exflagellation occurs below . Mature oocysts have diameters less than 20 micrometres. The average length of the sporozoites is greater than 10 micrometres. Both ends of the sporozoite are equally pointed.

While it was previously thought that Haemoproteus was limited to doves and related species, species in this genus have been isolated from frigatebirds.

Species list
 

Haemoproteus aegnithidae
Haemoproteus aegyptius
Haemoproteus africanus
Haemoproteus alaudae
Haemoproteus anatolicum
Haemoproteus anthi
Haemoproteus antigonis
Haemoproteus asturisdussumieri
Haemoproteus attenatus
Haemoproteus balearicae
Haemoproteus balli
Haemoproteus balmorali
Haemoproteus bambusicolae
Haemoproteus bennetti
Haemoproteus brachiatus
Haemoproteus beckeri
Haemoproteus belopolskyi
Haemoproteus bennetti
Haemoproteus borgesi
Haemoproteus brodkorbi
Haemoproteus bubalornis
Haemoproteus bucerotis
Haemoproteus canachites
Haemoproteus caprimulgi
Haemoproteus catharti 	 
Haemoproteus catenatus
Haemoproteus cellii
Haemoproteus centropi
Haemoproteus chelodina
Haemoproteus coatneyi
Haemoproteus columbae
Haemoproteus concavocentralis
Haemoproteus cornuata 
Haemoproteus crumenius
Haemoproteus cyanomitrae
Haemoproteus danilewskyi
Haemoproteus desseri
Haemoproteus dicaeus
Haemoproteus dicruri
Haemoproteus dolniki
Haemoproteus edomensis
Haemoproteus elani
Haemoproteus enucleator
Haemoproteus forresteri
Haemoproteus fringillae
Haemoproteus fusca
Haemoproteus gabaldoni
Haemoproteus garnhami
Haemoproteus geochelonis
Haemoproteus greineri

Haemoproteus goodmani
Haemoproteus halcyonis
Haemoproteus handai
Haemoproteus hirundinis
Haemoproteus himalayanus
Haemoproteus homobelopolskyi
Haemoproteus homopalloris
Haemoproteus homovelans
Haemoproteus hudaidensis
Haemoproteus iwa
Haemoproteus janovyi
Haemoproteus jenniae
Haemoproteus khani
Haemoproteus kopki
Haemoproteus krylovi
Haemoproteus lanii
Haemoproteus lari
Haemoproteus lophortyx
Haemoproteus kopki
Haemoproteus maccallumi
Haemoproteus mackerrasi
Haemoproteus macrovacuolatus
Haemoproteus madagascariensis
Haemoproteus majoris
Haemoproteus mansoni
Haemoproteus mathislegeri 
Haemoproteus melopeliae
Haemoproteus meleagridis
Haemoproteus meropis
Haemoproteus mesnili
Haemoproteus metchnikovi
Haemoproteus micronuclearis 
Haemoproteus minutus
Haemoproteus motacillae
Haemoproteus multipigmentatus
Haemoproteus multivolutinus
Haemoproteus nebraskensis
Haemoproteus nettionis
Haemoproteus nisi
Haemoproteus noctuae
Haemoproteus nucleofascialis
Haemoproteus nucleophilus
Haemoproteus oedurae
Haemoproteus orioli
Haemoproteus oryzivora
Haemoproteus ovalis 
Haemoproteus pallidus
Haemoproteus pallidulus
Haemoproteus palumbis
Haemoproteus pasteris

Haemoproteus pastoris
Haemoproteus parabelopolskyi
Haemoproteus paramultipigmentatus
Haemoproteus paranucleophilus 
Haemoproteus paruli
Haemoproteus passeris
Haemoproteus payevskyi
Haemoproteus peltocephali
Haemoproteus peircei
Haemoproteus pelouri
Haemoproteus phyllodactyli
Haemoproteus piresi
Haemoproteus plataleae
Haemoproteus pratosi
Haemoproteus prognei
Haemoproteus psittaci
Haemoproteus pteroclis
Haemoproteus ptyodactyli
Haemoproteus quelea
Haemoproteus raymundi
Haemoproteus rileyi
Haemoproteus rupicola
Haemoproteus sacharovi
Haemoproteus sanguinus
Haemoproteus sanîosdiasï
Haemoproteus sauianae
Haemoproteus sequeirae
Haemoproteus serini
Haemoproteus silvaï
Haemoproteus sturni
Haemoproteus sylvae
Haemoproteus syrnii
Haemoproteus tarentolae
Haemoproteus tartakovskyi
Haemoproteus telfordi
Haemoproteus tendeiroi
Haemoproteus tinnunculi
Haemoproteus thraupi
Haemoproteus trionyxi
Haemoproteus turtur
Haemoproteus uraeginthus
Haemoproteus vacuolatus
Haemoproteus valkiūnasi
Haemoproteus vangii
Haemoproteus velans
Haemoproteus vireonis
Haemoproteus wenyoni	
Haemoproteus witti
Haemoproteus xantholemae
Haemoproteus zosteropsis

Life cycle 

The infective stage is the sporozoite which is present in the salivary glands of the vector. Once the vector bites a new host, the sporozoites enter the blood stream and invade endothelial cells of blood vessels within various tissues including those of the lung, liver and spleen. Within the endothelial cells, the sporozoites undergo asexual reproduction becoming schizonts. These in turn produce numerous merozoites which penetrate the erythrocytes and mature into either female gametocytes (macrogametocytes) or male gametocytes (microgametocytes). Gametocytes can then be ingested by another blood-sucking insect where they undergo sexual reproduction in the midgut of the insect to produce oocysts. The oocysts rupture and release numerous sporozoites that invade the salivary gland and serve as a focus of subsequent infection for another host once the insect takes its next blood meal.

Description
Only gametocytes are found in the blood. Asexual reproduction occurs in body organs, especially the liver. The organisms occupy the majority of the cytoplasm, leaving the light magenta, finely granular, pink nucleus centrally located.

Taxonomy of this genus is difficult as there are few distinct morphological differences between the recognised species. Many of them were described under the 'one species-one host' hypothesis which is now thought to be potentially misleading. The morphological features most commonly used to describe a species include the number of pigment granules, the degree of encirclement of the host nucleus, the size of the parasite, the degree of host nucleus displacement and the degree of host cell enlargement. DNA studies should help to clarify this area but to date have rarely been undertaken.

The gametocytes have five basic forms:

thin gametocytes with incomplete margins (H. balearicae, H. pelouri)
halterial gametocytes (H. maccullumi)
thick sausage shaped gametocytes that fill most of the host cell and displace the host nucleus laterally (H. halyconis, H. plataleae)
gametocytes that encircle the host nucleus and fill the host cell (H. telfordi)
straight gametocytes that normally occur in anucleate cells and are almost as long as the host cell (H. enucleator)

Diagnostic criteria 

Gametocytes are only present within erythrocytes
 Gametocytes have a "halter-shaped" appearance with little displacement of the host nucleus
 Schizonts are not seen on peripheral blood smears
 Multiple pigment granules (hemozoin) are present within the erythrocytes

Pigment granules are refractile and yellow to brown in colour.

Pathology 

Infections with most Haemoproteus species appear to produce subclinical infections.

Post-mortem findings include enlargement of the spleen, liver and kidneys. These organs may appear chocolate-brown due to hemozoin deposition. Cytologic imprints may reveal schizont-laden endothelial cells. Some species of Haemoproteus will also form large, cyst-like bodies within the skeletal muscles that resembling those seen with Sarcocystis species infections.

Pigeons infected with H. columbae may develop enlarged gizzards; and anemia has been recorded.

Flocks of bobwhite quail (Colinus virginianus) may become infected with H. lophortyx. Infected birds may suffer from reluctance to move, ruffled appearance, prostration and death. Other findings include parasitemia and anemia. Large megaloschizonts may be present in skeletal muscles, particularly those of the thighs and back. The average cumulative mortality for flocks experiencing outbreaks may be over 20%.

Experimental infection of turkeys with H. meleagridis resulted in lameness, diarrhea, depression, emaciation, anorexia and occasionally anemia.

Muscovey ducks infected with H. nettionis suffered lameness, dyspnea and sudden death.

In other avian species, anemia and anorexia have been reported occasionally. Importantly, new records of Haemoproteus are discovered constantly and should still be monitored for effects on host condition.

Effect on vectors

H. columbae infects rock pigeons (Columba livia) and is vectored by a hippoboscid fly (Pseudolynchia canariensis). Both sexes of vector can transmit the parasite. Species of the Hippoboscoidea the superfamily to which Ps. canariensis belongs do not lay eggs. Instead the larvae hatch in utero, are fed internally by 'milk glands' and pass through three morphological stages before being deposited to pupate. The survival of female flies is significantly reduced when they were infected with the parasite. In contrast no effect is seen on male fly survival. Additionally the females produce fewer offspring when infected but the quality of the offspring does not seem to be affected.

Host records

Avian hosts
H. anthi — yellow wagtails (Motacilla flava)
H. antigonis — Florida sandhill crane (Grus canadensis pratensis)
H. balearicae — black crowned crane (Balearica pavonina gibbericeps, B. p. pavonina), Florida sandhill crane (Grus canadensis pratensis)
H. bambusicolae — bamboo partridge (Bambusicola thoracica sonorivox)
H. beckeri — gray catbird (Dumetella carolinensis)
H. (Parahaemoproteus) belopolskyi — blackcaps (Sylvia atricapilla)
H. bennetti — greater yellownape (Picus flavinucha)
H. borgesi — red cockaded woodpecker (Picoides borealis)
H. brachiatus — saker falcon (Falco cherrug)
H. bucerotis — red billed hornbill (Tockus erythrorhynchus)
H. (Parahaemoproteus) canachites — grouse
H. (Parahaemoproteus) catharti —  turkey vulture (Cathartes aura) 
H. (Parahaemoproteus) coatneyi — bananaquit (Coereba flaveola), white-crowned sparrows (Zonotrichia leucophrys)
H. (Haemoproteus) columbae — Japanese black wood pigeons (Columba janthina), pigeon (Columba livia), doves (Columbina talpacoti, Scardafella squammata, Zenaida auriculata), laughing dove (Stigmatopelia senegalensis), eastern white-winged doves (Z. asiatica asiatica), mourning doves (Z. macroura)
H. (Parahaemoproteus) concavocentralis — hawfinch (Coccothraustes coccothraustes)
H. cornuata — coppersmith barbet (Megalaima haemacephala)
H. crumenium — wood stork (Mycteria americana)
H. (Parahaemoproteus) cyanomitrae — olive sunbird (Nectarinia olivacea, Cyanomitra olivacea)
H. (Parahaemoproteus) danilewskyi — blue jays (Cyanocitta cristata)
H. (Parahaemoproteus) desseri — blossom headed parakeet (Psittacula roseata)
H. dicruri — fork tailed drongo (Dicrurus adsimilis), crested drongos (D. forficatus)
H. elani — Cooper's hawk (Accipiter cooperii), sharp shinned hawk (A. striatus)
H. enucleator — kingfisher (Ispidina picta)
H. (Parahaemoproteus) fringillae — rufous-winged (Aimophila carpalis), house finch (Carpodacus mexicanus), hawfinch (Coccothraustes coccothraustes), oriental magpie robin (Copsychus saularis), dark-eyed juncos (Junco hyemalis), American redstarts (Setophaga ruticilla)
H. forresteri — rufous-headed ground-roller (Atelornis crossleyi)
H. gabaldoni — Muscovy duck (Cairina moschata)
H. (Parahaemoproteus) garnhami — sparrows
H. goodmani — pitta-like ground-roller (Atelornis pittoides)
H. greineri —  wood ducks (Aix sponsa), common mergansers (Mergus merganser), common pochard (Aythya ferina)
H. handai — lesser sulphur-crested cockatoo (Cacatua sulphurea), plum-headed parakeet (Psittacula cyanocephala), ring necked parakeet (Psittacula krameri manillensis)
H. himalayanus — rufous sibia (Heterophasia capistrata)
H. (Parahaemoproteus) homobelopolskyi — red headed malimbe (Malimbus rubricollis), black headed weaver (Ploceus melanocephalus), red billed quelea (Quelea quelea) 
H. (Parahaemoproteus) homopalloris - wood warblers (Phylloscopus sibilatrix)
H. (Parahaemoproteus) homovelans — grey-faced woodpecker (Picus canus)
H. (Parahaemoproteus) hudaidensis — blue checked bee-eater (Merops superciliosus persicus Pallas)
H. ilanpapernai — spotted wood owl (Strix seloputo), Brown Hawk-Owl (Ninox scutulata)
H. iwa — great frigatebirds (Fregata minor), magnificent frigatebirds (F. magnificens)
H. janovyi — whitebacked vulture (Gyps africanus), hooded vulture (Necrosyrtes monachus), white-headed vulture (Trigonoceps occipitalis) lappet faced vulture (Torgos tracheliotus)
H. (Haemoproteus) jenniae — swallow tailed gull (Creagrus furcatus)
H. khani — crested drongos (Dicrurus forficatus)
H. (Parahaemoproteus) lanii — red backed shrike (Lanius collurio), woodchat shrike (L. senator)
H. lari — Caspian gulls (Larus cachinnans)
H. (Parahaemoproteus) lophortyx — California quail (Callipepla californica), scaled quail (Callipepla squamata), bobwhite quail (Colinus virginianus)
H. maccallumi — mourning doves (Zenaida macroura)
H. macrovacuolatus — black-bellied whistling duck (Dendrocygna autumnalis) 
H. madagascariensis — hook billed vanga (Vanga curvirostris)
H. majoris — Swainson's thrush (Catharus ustulatus), blue tit (Cyanistes caeruleus), collared flycatcher (Ficedula albicollis), pied flycatcher (F. hypoleuca)
H. mansoni — blue grouse (Dendragapus obscurus), ptarmigan (Lagopus lagopus)
H. meleagridis — turkey (Meleagris gallopavo)
H. (Parahaemoproteus) micronuclearis — red headed malimbe (Malimbus rubricollis), black headed weaver (Ploceus melanocephalus), red billed quelea (Quelea quelea) 
H. (Haemoproteus) multipigmentatus — Galapagos dove (Zenaida galapagoensis)
H. motacillae — yellow wagtails (Motacilla flava)
H. (Haemoproteus) multivolutinus — tambourine dove (Turtur timpanistria)
H. (Parahaemoproteus) nettionis — wood ducks (Aix sponsa), blue-winged teals (Anas discors), Pekin duck (Anas platyrhynchos), lesser scaups (Aythya affinis), common pochard (Aythya ferina), ring-necked ducks (Aythya collaris), Muscovey duck (Cairina moschata), trumpeter swans (Cygnus buccinator)
H. nisi  — Cooper's hawk (Accipiter cooperii), sharp shinned hawk (A. striatus)
H. (Parahaemoproteus) nucleofascialis — red headed malimbe (Malimbus rubricollis), black headed weaver (Ploceus melanocephalus), red billed quelea (Quelea quelea) 
H. noctuae — snowy owls (Nyctea scandiaca), spotted owl (Strix occidentalis)
H. orioli — golden oriole (Oriolus oriolus)
H. oryzivorae — oriental magpie robin (Copsychus saularis), Indian silverbill (Lonchura malabarica), tricoloured munia (L. malacca ruboniger), scaly-breasted munia (L. punctulata), baya weaver (Ploceus philippinus),  jungle babbler (Turdoides striata)
H. palumbus — pigeon (Columba palumbus palumbus)
H. pallidus — pied flycatcher (Ficedula hypoleuca), collared flycatcher (F. albicollis)
H. pallidulus — blackcap (Sylvia atricapilla)
H. parabelopolskyi — blackcap (Sylvia atricapilla)
H. (Haemoproteus) paramultipigmentatus — Socorro common ground dove (Columbina passerina socorroensis) 
H. passeris — Israeli house sparrow (Passer domesticus biblicus)
H. pasteris — pied myna (Sturnus contra), grey headed myna (S. malabaricus)
H. pastoris — greater blue eared glossy starling (Lamprotornis chalybaeus), pied myna (Sturnus contra)
H. payevskyi — great reed warbler (Acrocephalus arundinaceus), marsh warbler (A. palustris)
H. (Haemoproteus) piresi — pigeon (Columba livia)  
H. plataleae — glossy ibis (Plegadis falcinellus)
H. pratosi — Ahanta francolin (Francolinus ahantensis)
H. pratasi — helmeted guineafowl (Numida meleagris)
H. prognei — purple martin (Progne subis)
H. psittaci — African grey parrot (Psittacus erithacus)
H. raymundi — eastern olive sunbird (Nectarinia olivacea)
H. (Haemoproteus) sacharovi — eastern white-winged doves (Zenaida asiatica asiatica), mourning doves (Z. macroura)
H. sangunis — red whiskered bulbul (Pycnonotus jocosus emeria)
H. (Parahaemoproteus) sanîosdiasï — chicken (Gallus gallus) 
H. silvaï — guinea fowl (Numida meleagris mitrata) 
H. sylvae — great reed warbler (Acrocephalus arundinaceus)
H. syrnii — tawny owl (Strix aluco), spotted owl (S. occidentalis), European scops owl (Otus scops)
H. telfordi — MacQueen's bustards (Chlamydotis macqueenii), rufous-crested bustards (Eupodotis ruficrista), great bustard (Otis tarda)
H. tendeiroi — MacQueen's bustards (Chlamydotis macqueenii), rufous-crested bustards (Eupodotis ruficrista), great bustard (Otis tarda)
H. tinnunculi — American kestrel (Falco sparverius), Chimango caracara (Milvago chimango)
H. (Haemoproteus) turtur — turtle dove (Streptopelia turtur)
H. (Parahaemoproteus) vacuolatus — yellow whiskered greenbul (Andropadus latirostris)
H. (Parahaemoproteus) valkiūnasi — great frigatebirds (Fregata minor), lesser frigatebirds (F. ariel), Ascension frigatebirds (F. aquila)
H. vangii — hook billed vanga (Vanga curvirostris)
H. (Parahaemoproteus) velans — red-bellied woodpecker (Melanerpes carolinus), red-cockaded woodpecker (Picoides borealis)
H. zosteropsis — oriental white eye (Zosterops palpebrosa palpebrosa)

Reptile hosts
H. anatolicum — tortoise (Testudo graeca)
H. balli — Egyptian cobra (Naja haje haje)
H. chelodina — saw-shelled tortoise (Elseya latisternum)
H. edomensis — lizard (Agama stellio)
H. geochelonis — tortoise (Geochelone denticulata)
H. kopki — spotted Indian house gecko (Hemidactylus brookei), giant frog eye gecko (Teratoscincus scincus)
H. mackerrasi — Binoe's prickly gecko (Heteronotia binoei)
H. mesnili — spitting cobra (Naja nigricollis nigricolli)
H. metchnikovi — turtle (Chrysemys picta), yellow bellied terrapin (Tramchemys scripta)
H. oedurae — Australian northern velvet gecko (Oedura castelnaui)
H. peltocephali — river turtle (Peltocephalus dumerilianus)
H. phyllodactyli — gekkonid (Ptyodactylus elisa)
H. ptyodactyli — Kramer's yellow fan-fingered gecko (Ptyodactylus hasselquistii)
H. tarentolae — Moorish gecko (Tarentola mauritanica)
H. trionyxi — Ganges softshell turtle (Trionyx gangeticus)

Amphibian hosts
H. ovalis — cricket frog (Rana limnocharis)

Hosts known to be infected but Haemoproteus species not identified
common myna (Acridotheres tristis)
Blyth's reed warbler (Acrocephalus dumetorum)
sedge warblers (Acrocephalus schoenobaenus)
reed warbler (Acrocephalus scirpaceus)
clamorous reed warbler (Acrocephalus stentoreus)
black throated sunbird (Aethopyga saturata)
Spanish red-legged partridge (Alectoris rufa)
imperial eagles (Aquila heliaca)
canvasbacks (Aythya valisineria)
white cockatoo (Cacatua alba)
sulphur-crested cockatoo (Cacatua galerita)
speckled pigeon (Columba guinea)
white-rumped shama (Copsychus malabaricus) 
green jays (Cyanocorax yncas glaucescens)
European bee-eaters (Merops apiaster)
mute swan (Cygnus olor)
magnificent bird of paradise (Diphyllodes magnificus hunsteini)
red munia (Estrilda amandava)
lesser kestrel (Falco naumanni)
common kestrel (Falco tinnunculus)
Swainson's francolin (Francolinus swainsonii)
magnificent frigatebirds (Fregata magnificens)
chaffinch (Fringilla coelebs)
hill mynah (Gracula religiosa intermedia)
long tailed shrike (Lanius schach)
superb bird of paradise (Lophorina superba)
Egyptian kites (Milvus migrans aegypticus)
Guianan red-capped cardinal (Paroaria gularis gularis)
lesser flamingos (Phoeniconaias minor)
New Holland honeyeaters (Phylidonyris novaehollandiae)
streaked weaver (Ploceus manyar)
Surinam crested oropendola (Psarocolius decumanus decumanus)
Montezuma oropendolas (Psarocolius montezuma)
Guianan turquoise tanager (Tangara mexicana mexicana)
blue-necked tanager (Tangara cyanicollis caeruleocephala)
sacred ibis (Threskiornis aethiopicus)
white-crowned sparrows (Zonotrichia leucophrys oriantha)

Vectors
H. balmorali — Culicoides impunctatus
H. belopolskyi — Culicoides impunctatus
H. columbae — Ornithomyia avicularia, Pseudolynchia canariensis
H. danilewskyi — Culicoides arboricola, Culicoides edeni, Culicoides knowltoni
H. dolniki — Culicoides impunctatus
H. fringillae — Culicoides impunctatus
H. lanii — Culicoides impunctatus
H. lophortyx — Culicoides bottimeri, Lynchia hirsuta, Stilbometopa impressa
H. metchinikovi — Chrysops callidus
H. nettionis — Culicoides downesi
H. sacharovi — Peseudolynchia maura
H. syrnii — Ornithomyia avicularia
H. tartakovskyi — Culicoides impunctatus
H. turtur — Pseudolynchia canariensis

Avian families affected

The concept of a "one host-one species" was originally used in the taxonomy of this genus as it appears that the parasites are at least moderately host specific. After this rule was found to be incorrect, it was suggested that the avian parasite species were limited to single avian families. From an inspection of the host records above it is clear that this is not the case.

The avian species known to be infected are listed below:

Order Accipitriformes

Family 	Accipitridae

Cooper's hawk (Accipiter cooperii)
Sharp shinned hawk (Accipiter striatus)
Eastern imperial eagle (Aquila heliaca)
White-backed vulture (Gyps africanus)
Black kite (Milvus migrans)
Hooded vulture (Necrosyrtes monachus)
White-headed vulture (Trigonoceps occipitalis) 
Lappet faced vulture (Torgos tracheliotos)

Family Cathartidae

Turkey vulture (Cathartes aura)

Order Anseriformes

Family Anatidae

Wood duck (Aix sponsa)
Blue winged teal (Anas discors)
Mallard duck (Anas platyrhynchos)
Lesser scaup (Aythya affinis)
Ring necked duck (Aythya collaris)
Canvasback (Aythya valisineria)
Muscovy duck (Cairina moschata)
Trumpeter swan (Cygnus buccinator)
Mute swan (Cygnus olor) 
Black-bellied whistling duck (Dendrocygna autumnalis)
Common merganser (Mergus merganser)

Order Charadriiformes

Family Laridae

Swallow tailed gull (Creagrus furcatus)
Caspian gull (Larus cachinnans)

Order Ciconiiformes

Family Ciconiidae

Wood stork (Mycteria americana)

Order Columbiformes

Family Columbidae

Speckled pigeon (Columba guinea) 
Japanese wood pigeon (Columba janthina)
Rock pigeon (Columba livia)
Common wood pigeon (Columba palumbus) 
Socorro common ground dove (Columbina passerina socorroensis)
Ruddy ground dove (Columbina talpacoti)
Tambourine dove (Turtur timpanistria)
Scaled dove (Scardafella squammata)
European turtle dove (Streptopelia turtur)
Laughing dove (Stigmatopelia senegalensis)
White-winged dove (Zenaida asiatica)
Eared dove (Zenaida auriculata)
Galápagos Dove (Zenaida galapagoensis) 
Mourning dove (Zenaida macroura)

Order Coraciiformes

Family Alcedinidae

African pygmy kingfisher (Ispidina picta)

Family Brachypteraciidae

Rufous headed ground roller (Atelornis crossleyi)
Pitta like ground roller (Atelornis pittoides)

Family Bucerotidae

Red-billed hornbill (Tockus erythrorhynchus)

Family Meropidae

Blue checked bee-eater (Merops superciliosus)

Order Falconiformes

Family Falconidae

Saker falcon (Falco cherrug)
Lesser kestrel (Falco naumanni) 
American kestrel (Falco sparverius)
Common kestrel (Falco tinnunculus)
Chimango caracara (Milvago chimango)

Order Galliformes

Family Numididae

Helmeted guineafowl (Numida meleagris)

Family Odontophoridae

California quail (Callipepla californica)
Scaled quail (Callipepla squamata)
Bobwhite quail (Colinus virginianus)

Family Phasianidae

Red legged partridge (Alectoris rufa) 
Chinese bamboo partridge (Bambusicola thoracicus)
Ahanta francolin (Francolinus ahantensis)
Swainson's francolin (Francolinus swainsonii) 
Chicken (Gallus gallus)
Willow grouse (Lagopus lagopus)
Wild turkey (Meleagris gallopavo)

Family Tetraonidae

Dusky grouse (Dendragapus obscurus

Order Gruiformes

Family Gruidae

Black crowned crane (Balearica pavonina) 
Sandhill crane (Grus canadensis)

Family Otidae

MacQueen's bustard (Chlamydotis macqueenii)
Red crested bustard (Eupodotis ruficrista)
Great bustard (Otis tarda)

Order Passeriformes
 
Family Acrocephalidae

Great reed warbler (Acrocephalus arundinaceus)
Blyth's reed warbler (Acrocephalus dumetorum)
Marsh warbler (Acrocephalus palustris)
Sedge warbler (Acrocephalus schoenobaenus)
Reed warbler (Acrocephalus scirpaceus)
Clamorous reed warbler (Acrocephalus stentoreus)

Family Corvidae

Blue jay (Cyanocitta cristata) 
Green jay (Cyanocorax yncas)

Family Dicruridae

Fork-tailed drongo (Dicrurus adsimilis)
Crested drongo (Dicrurus forficatus)

Family 	Emberizidae

Dark eyed junco (Junco hyemalis)
Rufous winged sparrow (Peucaea carpalis)
White crowned sparrow (Zonotrichia leucophrys)

Family Estrildidae

Red munia (Amandava amandava) 
Indian silverbill (Euodice malabarica)
Tricoloured munia (Lonchura malacca)
Scaly breasted munia (Lonchura punctulata)

Family Fringillidae

House finch (Carpodacus mexicanus) 
Hawfinch (Coccothraustes coccothraustes)
Chaffinch (Fringilla coelebs)

Family Hirundinidae

Purple martin (Progne subis)

Family Icteridae

Crested oropendola (Psarocolius decumanus)
Montezuma oropendola (Psarocolius montezuma)

Family Laniidae

Red backed shrike (Lanius collurio)
Long tailed shrike (Lanius schach)
Woodchat shrike (Lanius senator)

Family Meliphagidae

New Holland honeyeaters (Phylidonyris novaehollandiae)

Family Mimidae

Gray catbird (Dumetella carolinensis)

Family Motacillidae

Yellow wagtail (Motacilla flava)

Family Muscicapidae

White rumped shama (Copsychus malabaricus)
Oriental magpie robin (Copsychus saularis)

Family 	Nectariniidae

Black throated sunbird (Aethopyga saturata)
Olive sunbird (Cyanomitra olivacea)

Family Oriolidae

Golden oriole (Oriolus oriolus)

Family Paridae	

Blue tit (Cyanistes caeruleus)

Family Paradisaeidae

Magnificent bird of paradise (Cicinnurus magnificus)
Superb bird of paradise (Lophorina superba)

Family Parulidae

American redstart (Setophaga ruticilla)

Family Passeridae

House sparrow (Passer domesticus)

Family Ploceidae

Red headed malimbe (Malimbus rubricollis)
Streaked weaver (Ploceus manyar)
Black-headed weaver (Ploceus melanocephalus)
Baya weaver (Ploceus philippinus)
Red billed quelea (Quelea quelea)

Family Pycnonotidae

Yellow whiskered bulbul (Andropadus latirostris)
Red whiskered bulbul (Pycnonotus jocosus)

Family Sturnidae

Common myna (Acridotheres tristis)
Common hill myna (Gracula religiosa)
Chestnut tailed starling  (Sturnia malabarica)
Asian pied starling (Sturnus contra)
Greater blue eared glossy starling (Lamprotornis chalybaeus)

Family Sylviidae

Blackcap (Sylvia atricapilla)

Family Thraupidae

Bananaquit (Coereba flaveola)
Red capped cardinal (Paroaria gularis)
Blue necked tanager (Tangara cyanicollis)
Turquoise tanager (Tangara mexicana)

Family Timaliidae

Rufous sibia (Heterophasia capistrata)
Jungle babbler (Turdoides striata)

Family Turdidae

Swainson's thrush (Catharus ustulatus)

Family Vangidae

Hook billed vanga (Vanga curvirostris)

Family Zosteropidae

Oriental white eye (Zosterops palpebrosus)

Order Pelecaniformes

Family Fregatidae

Magnificent frigatebird (Fregata magnificens)
Great frigatebird (Fregata minor)

Family Threskiornithidae

African sacred ibis (Threskiornis aethiopicus) 
Glossy ibis (Plegadis falcinellus)

Order Piciformes

Family Megalaimidae

Coppersmith barbet (Megalaima haemacephala)

Family Picidae

Red bellied woodpecker (Melanerpes carolinus)
Red cockaded woodpecker (Picoides borealis) 
Grey faced woodpecker (Picus canus)
Greater yellownape (Picus flavinucha)

Order Phoenicopteriformes

Family Phoenicopteridae

Lesser flamingo (Phoenicopterus minor)

Order Psittaciformes

Family Cacatuidae

White cockatoo (Cacatua alba)
Sulphur crested cockatoo (Cacatua galerita)
Yellow crested cockatoo (Cacatua sulphurea)

Family Psittacidae

Plum headed parakeet (Psittacula cyanocephala)
Rose ringed parakeet (Psittacula krameri)
Blossom headed parakeet (Psittacula roseata) 
African grey parrot (Psittacus erithacus)

Order Strigiformes

Family Strigidae

Snowy owl (Bubo scandiacus)
Brown Hawk-Owl (Ninox scutulata)
European scops owl (Otus scops)
Brown owl (Strix aluco)
Spotted owl (Strix occidentalis)
Spotted wood owl (Strix seloputo)

Notes
Haemoproteus balazuci Dias 1953 is a junior synonym of H. testudinalis

Haemoproteus gymnorhidis de Mello 1936, Haemoproteus granulosum Rey Vila 1945, Haemoproteus danilewskyi var. urbanensis Sachs 1953 and Haemoproteus zasukhini Burtikashvili 1973 are considered to be synonyms of H. passeris Kruse 1890.

Haemoproteus rouxi Novy and MacNeal 1904 is a nomen nudum.

References

Haemosporida
Apicomplexa genera
Poultry diseases
Veterinary protozoology
Parasites of reptiles
Parasites of amphibians